Clarence J. Cormier (July 14, 1930 – April 26, 2012) was a Canadian politician. He served in the Legislative Assembly of New Brunswick from 1982 to 1987, as a Progressive Conservative member for the constituency of Memramcook. He was minister of education from 1982 to 1985, and was the first Acadian to occupy that position. He was also mayor of Dieppe, New Brunswick from 1977 to 1983.

References

Progressive Conservative Party of New Brunswick MLAs
1930 births
2012 deaths